This is a list of Canadian television related events from 1992.

Events

Debuts

Ending this year

Changes of network affiliation

Television shows

1950s
Country Canada (1954–2007)
Hockey Night in Canada (1952–present)
The National (1954–present).
Front Page Challenge (1957–1995)

1960s
CTV National News (1961–present)
Land and Sea (1964–present)
Man Alive (1967–2000)
Mr. Dressup (1967–1996)
The Nature of Things (1960–present, scientific documentary series)
Question Period (1967–present, news program)
W-FIVE (1966–present, newsmagazine program)

1970s
Canada AM (1972–present, news program)
the fifth estate (1975–present, newsmagazine program)
Marketplace (1972–present, newsmagazine program)
100 Huntley Street (1977–present, religious program)

1980s
Adrienne Clarkson Presents (1988–1999)
CityLine (1987–present, news program)
CODCO (1987–1993)
Fashion File (1989–2009)
Fred Penner's Place (1985–1997)
Good Rockin' Tonite (1989–1992)
Katts and Dog (1988–1993)
The Kids in the Hall (1989–1994)
Just For Laughs (1988–present)
Midday (1985–2000)
On the Road Again (1987–2007)
Road to Avonlea (1989–1996)
Street Legal (1987–1994)
Under the Umbrella Tree (1986–1993)
Venture (1985–2007)
Video Hits (1984–1993)

1990s
 African Skies (1991–1994)
 Are You Afraid of the Dark? (1990–1996)
 E.N.G. (1990–1994)
 Material World (1990–1993)
 Northwood (1991–1994)
 Neon Rider (1990–1995)
 The Red Green Show (1991–2006)

TV movies
Timothy Findley: Anatomy of a Writer

Networks and services

Network launches

Television stations

Debuts

See also
 1992 in Canada
 List of Canadian films of 1992

References